Lachana kulu is a species of moth of the subfamily Lymantriinae from northern India seen once in 1913.

Taxonomy
It was described as a new species in 2008 by Tatyana A. Trofimova from a two male specimens collected by Henry John Elwes from the Kullu Valley of northern India in 1913, which had sat undescribed at the Zoological Institute of the Russian Academy of Sciences, St. Petersburg for the past century. The holotype was designated by Trofimova as one of the two specimens.

Etymology
The species name is derived from the name of the locality where the types were found.

Description
The wingspan is about 25 mm. The head, thorax, abdomen and legs are covered with long silky brown and grey hairs. The forewings are triangular, with a grey ground colour and without bands. The scales are needle shaped with a toothed edge. The hindwings are widely triangular. The marginal half is grey. There is a round discal spot with white scales. The males have highly bipectinate (feathered) antennae. 

The female has never been seen.

Similar species
Trofimova considered it most closely related to Lachana alpherakii, a species with a larger distribution to the east in the mountains of southwestern China. It differs from this species by the generally darker grey wing colouration. It is the only Lachana with a light-coloured fringe to its wings, and can further be distinguished by morphological details of the valva, a component of the male genitalia.

Distribution
It is only known from two specimens collected in the Kullu Valley of the southern Himalayas in northern Himachal Pradesh, India, in 1913, and has never been seen since.

It has the most southwestern distribution of the Lachana species. It is not sympatric with any other Lachana species; the nearest species is L. ladakensis found in the mountains of Ladakh some 400 km due north.

Ecology
Absolutely nothing is known about the ecology of this species.

References

Moths described in 2008
Lymantriinae